The Inot is a right tributary of the river Barcău in Romania. It discharges into the Barcău in Marghita.

References

Rivers of Romania
Rivers of Bihor County